ISO 3166-2:LU is the entry for Luxembourg in ISO 3166-2, part of the ISO 3166 standard published by the International Organization for Standardization (ISO), which defines codes for the names of the principal subdivisions (e.g., provinces or states) of all countries coded in ISO 3166-1.

Currently for Luxembourg, ISO 3166-2 codes are defined for 12 cantons.

Each code consists of two parts, separated by a hyphen. The second part is a letter.

Current codes
Subdivision names are listed as in the ISO 3166-2 standard published by the ISO 3166 Maintenance Agency (ISO 3166/MA).

ISO 639-1 codes are used to represent subdivision names in the following administrative languages:
 (de): German
 (fr): French
 (lb): Luxembourgish

Click on the button in the header to sort each column.

Former codes

Prior to 2015, ISO 3166-2 codes were defined for 3 districts.

Click on the button in the header to sort each column.

See also
 Subdivisions of Luxembourg
 FIPS region codes of Luxembourg
 NUTS codes of Luxembourg

External links
 ISO Online Browsing Platform: LU
 Districts of Luxembourg, Statoids.com

2:LU
ISO 3166-2
Luxembourg geography-related lists